Macrocephaly is a condition in which circumference of the human head is abnormally large. It may be pathological or harmless, and can be a familial genetic characteristic. People diagnosed with macrocephaly will receive further medical tests to determine whether the syndrome is accompanied by particular disorders. Those with benign or familial macrocephaly are considered to have megalencephaly.

Causes

Many people with abnormally large heads or large skulls are healthy, but macrocephaly may be pathological. Pathologic macrocephaly may be due to megalencephaly (enlarged brain), hydrocephalus (abnormally increased cerebrospinal fluid), cranial hyperostosis (bone overgrowth), and other conditions. Pathologic macrocephaly is called "syndromic", when it is associated with any other noteworthy condition, and "nonsyndromic" otherwise. Pathologic macrocephaly may be caused by congenital anatomic abnormalities, genetic conditions, or by environmental events.

Many genetic conditions are associated with macrocephaly, including familial macrocephaly related to the holgate gene, autism, PTEN mutations such as Cowden disease, neurofibromatosis type 1, and tuberous sclerosis; overgrowth syndromes such as Sotos syndrome (cerebral gigantism), Weaver syndrome, Simpson–Golabi–Behmel syndrome (bulldog syndrome), and macrocephaly-capillary malformation (M-CMTC) syndrome; neurocardiofacial-cutaneous syndromes such as Noonan syndrome, Costello syndrome, Gorlin syndrome, (also known as Basal Cell Nevus Syndrome) and cardiofaciocutaneous syndrome; Fragile X syndrome; leukodystrophies (brain white matter degeneration) such as Alexander disease, Canavan disease, and megalencephalic leukoencephalopathy with subcortical cysts; and glutaric aciduria type 1 and D-2-hydroxyglutaric aciduria.

At one end of the genetic spectrum, duplications of chromosomes have been found to be related to autism and macrocephaly; at the other end, deletions of chromosomes have been found to be related to schizophrenia and microcephaly.

Environmental events associated with macrocephaly include infection, neonatal intraventricular hemorrhage (bleeding within the infant brain), subdural hematoma (bleeding beneath the outer lining of the brain), subdural effusion (collection of fluid beneath the outer lining of the brain), and arachnoid cysts (cysts on the brain surface).

In research, cranial height or brain imaging may be used to determine intracranial volume more accurately.

Below is a list of causes of macrocephaly from Swaiman's Pediatric Neurology: Principles and Practice noted in The Little Black Book of Neurology:

Hydrocephalus

Noncommunicating 
 Arnold–Chiari malformation
 Aqueductal stenosis
 X-linked hydrocephalus with stenosis of the aqueduct of Sylvius (HSAS) syndrome (L1CAM)
 Dandy–Walker malformation
 Galenic vein aneurysm or malformation
 Neoplasms, supratentorial, and infratentorial
 Arachnoid cyst, infratentorial
 Holoprosencephaly with dorsal interhemispheric sac

Communicating 
 External or extraventricular obstructive hydrocephalus (dilated subarachnoid space)

Arachnoid cyst, supratentorial

Meningeal fibrosis/obstruction 
 Postinflammatory
 Posthemorrhagic
 Neoplastic infiltration

Vascular 
 Arteriovenous malformation
 Intracranial hemorrhage
 Dural sinus thrombosis

Choroid plexus papilloma

Neurocutaneous syndromes 
 Incontinentia pigmenti

Destructive lesions
 Hydranencephaly
 Porencephaly

Familial, autosomal-dominant, autosomal-recessive, X-linked

Subdural fluid
 Hematoma
 Hygroma
 Empyema

Brain edema (toxic-metabolic) 
 Intoxication
 Lead
 Vitamin A
 Tetracycline
 Endocrine (hypoparathyroidism, hypoadrenocorticism)
 Galactosemia
 Idiopathic (pseudotumorcerebri)

Thick skull or scalp (hyperostosis) 

 Familial variation
 Anemia
 Osteoporosis, severe precocious autosomal-recessive osteoporosis (CLCN7, TCIRG1)
 Pycnodysostosis (CTSK)
 Craniometaphyseal dysplasia (ANKH)
 Craniodiaphyseal dysplasia
 Pyle dysplasia
 Sclerosteosis (SOST)
 Paget's disease
 Idiopathic hyperphosphatasia
 Familial osteoectasia
 Osteogenesis imperfecta
 Rickets
 Cleidocranial dysostosis
 Hyperostosis corticalis generalisata (van Buchem disease)
 Proteus syndrome

Megalencephaly and hemimegalencephaly 

 Megalencephaly
 Hemimegalencephaly

Genetic 

 Alpha-mannosidosis
 Atkin-Flaitz-Patil syndrome
 D-Bitfunctional protein deficiency
 Greig cephalopolysyndactyly syndrome
 Desmosterolosis
 Hyperostosis corticalis deformans juvenilis
 Legius syndrome
 Mucolipidosis II alpha/beta
 Mucopolysaccharidosis VII
 Muenke syndrome
 Opitz-Kaveggia syndrome
 Toriello-Carey syndrome
 Van der Knaap disease
 Waisman-Laxova syndrome
 Maple syrup urine disease
 Morquio syndrome
 Rubinstein-Taybi syndrome
 Tuberous sclerosis
 Cowden disease
 Congenital syphilis

Diagnosis
Macrocephaly is customarily diagnosed if head circumference is greater than two standard deviations (SDs) above the mean. Relative macrocephaly occurs if the measure is less than two SDs above the mean, but is disproportionately above that when ethnicity and stature are considered. Diagnosis can be determined in utero or can be determined within 18–24 months after birth in some cases where head circumference tends to stabilize in infants. Diagnosis in infants includes measuring the circumference of the child's head and comparing how significant it falls above the 97.5 percentile of children similar to their demographic. If falling above the 97.5th percentile then the patient will be checked to determine whether there is any intracranial pressure present and whether or not immediate surgery is needed.  If immediate surgery is not needed then further testing will be done to determine whether the patient has either macrocephaly or benign macrocephaly.

Diagnosis for macrocephaly involves the comparison of the infant's head circumference to that of other infants of the same age and ethnicity. If a patient is suspected of having macrocephaly molecular testing will be used to confirm diagnosis. Symptoms vary on the cause of macrocephaly on the child and if the child has any other accompanying syndromes which will be determined through molecular testing.

Benign or familial macrocephaly 
Benign macrocephaly can occur without reason or be inherited by one or both parents (in which it is considered benign familial macrocephaly and is considered megalencephaly form of macrocephaly). Diagnoses for familial macrocephaly is determined by measuring the head circumference of both parents and comparing it to the child's. Benign and familial macrocephaly is not associated with neurological disorders. While benign and familial macrocephaly does not result in neurological disorders, neurodevelopment will still be assessed.

Although neurological disorders do not occur, temporary symptoms of benign and familial macrocephaly include: developmental delay, epilepsy, and mild hypotonia.

Neurodevelopment is assessed for all cases and suspected cases of macrocephaly to determine whether and what treatments may be needed, and whether any other syndrome/s may be present or likely to develop.

Treatment 
Treatment varies depending on whether or not it occurs with other medical conditions in the child and where cerebrospinal fluid is present.
If benign and found between the brain and skull then no surgery is needed.
If excess fluid is found between the ventricle spaces in the brain then surgery will be needed.

Associated syndromes 

Below is a list of syndromes associated with macrocephaly that are noted in Signs and Symptoms of Genetic Conditions: A Handbook.

Include multiple major and or minor anomalies 
 Acrocallosal syndrome
 Apert syndrome
 Bannayan–Riley–Ruvalcaba syndrome
 Cardiofaciocutaneous syndrome
 Chromosome 14 - maternal disomy
 Chromosome 22qter deletion
 Cleidocranial dysostosis
 Costello syndrome
 Encephalocraniocutaneous lipomatosis
 FG syndrome
 Hallermann–Streiff syndrome
 Hydrolethalus syndrome
 Hypomelanosis syndrome
 Hypomelanosis of Ito
 Kelvin Peter anomaly plus syndrome
 Lujan–Fryns syndrome
 Macrocephaly-CM (MCAP)
 Marshall–Smith syndrome
 Neuhauser megalocornea/MR syndrome
 Neurofibromatosis type I
 Nevoid basal-cell carcinoma syndrome
 Noonan syndrome
 Ocular-ectodermal syndrome
 Osteopathia striata - cranial sclerosis
 Perlman syndrome
 Robinow syndrome
 Simpson–Golabi–Behmel syndrome
 Sotos syndrome
 Sturge–Weber syndrome
 Weaver syndrome
 Wiedemann–Rautenstrauch syndrome
 3C syndrome

Secondary to a metabolic disorder 
 Glutaric aciduria type II
 GM1 gangliosidosis
 Hunter syndrome
 Hurler syndrome
 MPS VII
 Sanfilippo syndrome
 Zellweger syndrome

Associated with a skeletal dysplasia 
 Achondroplasia
 Campomelic dysplasia
 Craniodiaphyseal dysplasia
 Craniometaphyseal dysplasia
 Hypochondrogenesis
 Hypochondroplasia
 Kenny-Caffey syndrome
 Kniest dysplasia
 Lenz–Majewski syndrome
 Osteogenesis imperfecta III
 Osteopetrosis, autosomal recessive form
 Schneckenbecken dysplasia
 Sclerosteosis
 Short rib syndrome, beemer-langer type
 Short rib-polydactyly 2 (majewski type)
 Spondyloepiphyseal dysplasia congenita
 Thanatophoric dysplasia

With no obvious physical findings 
 Alexander disease
 Canavan disease
 Cobalamin deficiency (combined methylmalonic aciduria and homocystinuria)
 Dandy–Walker malformation
 Glutaric aciduria type 1
 L-2-hydroxyglutaric aciduria
 Megalencephalic leukoencephalopathy with subcortical cysts
 Osteogenesis imperfecta IV
 Osteopathia striata-cranial sclerosis
 Periventricular heterotopia
 Sandhoff disease
 Tay–Sachs disease

See also
 Microcephaly
 Megalencephaly
 Hydrocephalus

References

External links 
  GeneReviews/NCBI/NIH/UW entry on PTEN Hamartoma Tumor Syndrome (PHTS)
  GeneReviews/NCBI/NIH/UW entry on 9q22.3 Microdeletion

Congenital disorders of musculoskeletal system